Trogonoptera trojana, the Palawan birdwing or triangle birdwing, is a birdwing butterfly of the family Papilionidae. It is endemic to Palawan in the Philippines. It is one of only two species in its genus, the other being the more widespread Rajah Brooke's birdwing, where the male has larger green markings on the hindwings. This species is included in CITES Appendix II, restricting international export to those who have been granted a permit. The species may be observed flying at any point during the year. The larvae feed on Aristolochia.

Taxonomy
Genus: Trogonoptera Rippon, 1890
Species: Trogonoptera brookiana Wallace, 1855
Subspecies: Trogonoptera brookiana brookiana (Wallace, 1855)
Form: Trogonoptera brookiana brookiana f. brookiana Wallace, 1855
Form: Trogonoptera brookiana brookiana f. julijae S.Hu, 2007
Subspecies: Trogonoptera brookiana toshikii Kobayashi, 1991
Subspecies: Trogonoptera brookiana akikoa Morita, 1994
Species: Trogonoptera trojana Honrath, 1886

Illustrations

References

External links
 
 

Papilionidae
Butterflies of Indochina
Lepidoptera of the Philippines
Endemic fauna of the Philippines
Fauna of Palawan
Butterflies described in 1889